A list of strategic bombing over the United Kingdom in World War II includes the towns and cities that received significant aerial destruction from 1940 to 1942 in the United Kingdom. After mid-1944 the Luftwaffe would struggle to defend their own skies.

History
The main German bombing across the UK occurred until June 1941. Around 40,000 people were killed. The German raids began as daylight raids, but would later be mostly at night from September 1940 onwards.

The Luftwaffe dropped around 36,800 tonnes in 1940 and around 21,800 tonnes in 1941. It would drop around 3,000 tonnes per year from then on.

Strategic bombing
 Bombing of Birmingham; Birmingham had many armaments factories, with aircraft and automotive factories
 Bombing of Cardiff; Cardiff was a relatively straightforward city to find, being on the sea
 Bombing of Liverpool; Liverpool was the main port to receive cargo from the US
 Bombing of London - The Blitz; it began over London on 7 September 1940, and inadvertently gave the RAF Fighter Command airfields of South East England the time and unexpected opportunity to repair their much-damaged facilities; the Blitz ended on 11 May 1941
 Bombing of Manchester; the Manchester area contained many factories, such as Avro
 Bombing of Plymouth; Plymouth was the home of much of the Royal Navy
 Bombing of Southampton; Southampton was an important port and contained the Supermarine works, situated next to the sea
 Bombing of Kingston Upon Hull; Kingston upon Hull was the most severely damaged British city or town during the Second World War, with 95 percent of houses damaged.

See also
 Air warfare of World War II
 Blitz Street, Channel 4 documentary series that exploded that the same weights of ordnance, showing the effects of blast
 List of strategic bombing over Germany in World War II

References

External links
 Imperial War Museum

Strategic
United Kingdom
United Kingdom